Vette! is a 1989 racing video game published by Spectrum Holobyte for MS-DOS compatible operating systems in 1989. Macintosh and NEC PC-9801 ports followed. The objective is to race a Chevrolet Corvette through the streets of San Francisco. The game uses a 3D, flat-shaded polygon rendering of the city, including landmarks such as the Golden Gate Bridge, the San Francisco Bay Bridge, and Lombard Street. It was released on three floppy disks in both a black and white and color version.

A Sega Genesis version was planned, but never released.

Gameplay

Car damage that affected the car's engine and handling.
Full control over the game's camera views, including an interior cam with a full working dashboard.
The ability to drive anywhere within the modeled city including highways, tunnels, and bridges.
Pulling over at various gas stations that would repair the car.
The player is able to run people over.
Driving erratically can attract the attention of a nearby cop, triggering a chase, which can result in getting pulled over. There are 8 excuses to choose from unless charged for vehicular homicide by running over at least 1 pedestrian during the chase, or within close proximity of a cop.

At the beginning of the game, a question from the manual requires a correct answer to prove game ownership. If the question is falsely answered, the game can be played for a limited time before a window popped up claiming "You have been caught driving a stolen Vette!", followed by the game crashing.

Development
During the development of this game, the attack on protesting Chinese students in Tiananmen Square occurred. In memory of that event, one of the programmers snuck this string into the program executable: "IN MEMORY OF THOSE WHO WERE MURDERED IN TIAN-AN-MEN SQUARE ON JUNE 4, 1989. J.P. "

Reception
Tony Dillon of ACE praised Vette! for its "complexity of design combined with clever simplicity in presentation" and its varied gameplay, and opined that the game "doesn't quite have the edge over Stunt Car, but it sure isn't far behind." Peter Scisco of Compute! favorably reviewed the game, describing it as "Falcon AT on the ground." He praised the game's detail and EGA graphics, only criticizing the lack of sound card support, and concluded that "Vette! surpasses other driving simulations in its scope and realism".

References

External links

1989 video games
Chevrolet Corvette
DOS games
Cancelled Sega Genesis games
Classic Mac OS games
Multiplayer and single-player video games
NEC PC-9801 games
North America-exclusive video games
Racing video games
Racing video games set in the United States
Spectrum HoloByte games
Video games developed in the United States
Video games set in San Francisco